Christian Harrison and Peter Polansky were the defending champions but only Harrison chose to defend his title, partnering Andrew Harris. Harrison lost in the semifinals to Chung Yun-seong and Michail Pervolarakis.

Chung and Pervolarakis won the title after defeating Malek Jaziri and Kaichi Uchida 6–7(5–7), 7–6(7–3), [16–14] in the final.

Seeds

Draw

References

External links
 Main draw

Orlando Open - Doubles